The northern Indian state of Uttarakhand, comprises 2 administrative divisions. Within these 2 divisions, there are a total of 13 districts. The following table shows the name of each division, its administrative headquarters, its constituent districts, and a map of its location.

List of divisions

See also
 List of districts of Uttarakhand
 List of parganas of Uttarakhand
 List of tehsils of Uttarakhand
 List of community development blocks of Uttarakhand
 List of divisions in India

References

Divisions of Uttarakhand
Uttarakhand-related lists